The bird genus Pseudibis consists of two South-East Asian species in the ibis subfamily, Threskiornithinae. The giant ibis is also sometimes placed in this genus.

Genus Pseudibis 

The white-shouldered ibis is critically endangered.

External links

 Genus Pseudibis

 
Bird genera